Blaine is a given name. Notable people with the name include:

 Blaine Bishop (born 1970), American former National Football League safety
 Blaine Boyer (born 1981), American Major League Baseball pitcher
 Blaine Calkins (born 1968), Canadian politician
 Blaine Denning (1930–2016), American basketball player
 Blaine Earon (born 1927), American retired National Football League lineman
 Blaine Gabbert (born 1989), American National Football League quarterback
 L. Blaine Hammond (born 1952), American test pilot and retired astronaut and US Air Force colonel
 Blaine Hardy (born 1987), American baseball player
 Blaine Harrison (born 1985), English indie/rock musician
 Blaine Higgs (born 1954), Canadian politician
 Blaine Johnson (1962-1996), American drag racer
 Blaine Kruger (born 1985), Canadian Football League wide receiver
 Blaine Lacher (born 1970), Canadian retired National Hockey League goalie
 Blaine Larsen (born 1986), American country music singer and songwriter
 H. Blaine Lawson (born 1942), American mathematician
 Blaine Lindgren (born 1939), American track and field hurdler
 Blaine Luetkemeyer (born 1952), U.S. Representative from Missouri
 Blaine (cartoonist) (1937–2012), Canadian editorial cartoonist Blaine MacDonald
 Blaine McCallister (born 1958), American golfer with five PGA Tour wins
 Blaine McElmurry (born 1973), American retired National Football League safety
 Blaine Nye (born 1946), American retired National Football League lineman and businessman
 Blaine Pedersen, Canadian politician
 M. Blaine Peterson (1906-1985), U.S. Representative from Utah
 Blaine Saipaia (born 1978), American National Football League player
 Blaine Schmidt (born 1963), retired Canadian Football League player
 Blaine Scully (born 1988), American rugby union player
 Blaine Stoughton (born 1953), Canadian retired National Hockey League player
 Blaine Taylor (born 1958), American college basketball player and coach
 Blaine Thacker (1941–2020), Canadian politician
 Blaine Thurier (born 1967), Canadian musician and film producer
 Blaine Willenborg (born 1960), American former tennis player
 Blaine Wilson (born 1974), American retired gymnast

Fictional characters named Blaine include:
 Blaine (Pokémon) (Katsura in the original Japanese version), the name of a gym leader in the Pokémon universe
 Blaine Anderson, in the TV series Glee
 Blaine the Mono, a psychotic artificial intelligence-controlled monorail locomotive in Stephen King's novels The Wastelands and Wizard and Glass
 Blaine Edwards, a character portrayed by Damon Wayans in the In Living Color sketch Men on Film

See also
Blaine (surname)
Blane (given name)